Tropicoporus tropicalis is part of the family Hymenochaetaceae, and was recently renamed to Tropicoporus tropicalis from Inonotus tropicalis, which is part of the Inonotus clade B. Tropicoporus tropicalis is a wood-decaying basidiomycetes that rarely causes disease in animals and human, and is commonly found in humid climate such as Brazil. In its natural environment, the fungus is associated with white rot woody angiosperms, and has its annual fruiting body on tree trunks and branches. Tropicoporus tropicalis has two kinds of hyphae (a dimitic hyphal system), generative and skeletal, that lack clamp connections.

Taxonomy, classification, and phylogeny
The earliest record of Tropicoporus tropicalis is by the name Poria rickii, which is then modified into Phellinus rickii, and then renamed to Phellinus tropicalis. However, it is later suggested that Phellinus tropicalis should belong to one of the Inonotus sensu stricto clade after phylogenetic analysis of the fungus's rDNA nuclear LSU sequence. The name Inonotus rickii was also used to describe this fungus, and it is also a species of Inonotus sensu stricto.

The genus Inonotus contains at least three clades (A, B, and C), and Clade B and C have species from the Inonotus linteus complex, which was transferred from Inonotus sensu stricto. However, the Inonotus linteus complex is later divided into Sanghuangporus and Tropicoporus.  After the transfer from Inonotus sensu stricto to Inonotus linteus, and then to Tropicoporus, the fungus is currently named as Tropicoporus tropicalis.

Description and characteristics
Tropicoporus tropicalis is a fungus with the growth characteristics of being appressed, short-downy, homogeneous, adherent, even margins, indistinct, and odourless. It is also woolly and yellowish-orange colonies, with annual fruiting bodies and dimitic hyphal system, which refers to the appearance of two kinds of hyphae: generative (2.5 – 4 ɥm in diameter, thin-walled, simple-septate, and pale yellowish brown), and skeletal (3.5 – 4.5 ɥm in diameter, thick-walled, infrequently simple-septate, and dull yellowish brown). Moreover,  the fungus lacks setal hyphae and clamp connections in its hyphae, which is either thin or thick walled. However, it has numerous reddish brown Hymenial setae that has a maximum length of 25 ɥm, and has dull brown pores that becomes whiter near the margin. The Basidiocarp of Tropicoporus tropicalis is annual, resupinate, and hyaline. The abundant fungal spores are coloured yellowish to ochraceous, and shaped ovoid to broadly ellipsoid and smooth when mature. Both the spores (7 - 9 per mm) and the basidiospores are small, with basidiospores having more than 3.5 um wide when it is ellipsoid, and are less than 3.5 um wide when it is sub-globose.

Physiology
The fungus grows:
 Moderately rapid in MEA (Malt Extract Agar)
 In 0.05% cycloheximide
The mat diameter of the fungus depends on temperature, but the optimal growth temperature is around 36 °C, and the maximum temperature without growth (not killed) is 44 °C. Even though all parts of the fungus could be darkened by 2% KOH, only the hyphae can be stained by phloxine, a reddish dye. Furthermore, Tropicoporus tropicalis is also found to be highly resistant to caspofungin and posaconazole, two different anti-fungal compounds.

Ecology and habitat
Tropicoporus tropicalis is a poroid wood-decaying basidiomycete that is usually associated with white rot woody angiosperms, grow on deciduous wood, and have fruiting body on infected tree trunks and branches.  It is mainly found in the tropical zone and humid climate, such as Brazil; but is present in Mississippi, Florida, Georgia, Jamaica, Guadeloupe, Costa Rica, Colombia, East Africa, and Malaya, Johore, and Mawaii Malaysia.

Diseases
Tropicoporus tropicalis rarely causes diseases in animals and human. However, it is an opportunistic pathogen that has the potential to induce allergic and invasive diseases in mammals.

Animal
The fungus has been recorded to cause fungal pericardial effusion and myocarditis in a French bulldog, that was under immunosuppressive therapy (species was non-pigmented, and has indication of a hyalohyphomycosis infection); and induced a granulomatous mediastinal mass in an immunocompromised Irish Wolfhound dog.

Human
The first association of an invasive infection on human occurred on a patient with chronic granulomatous disease. In addition, two similar chronic granulomatous disease cases of I. tropicalis infection were later found in immunodeficient children and adults that  had caused osteomyelitis.

References

Animal fungal diseases
Hymenochaetaceae
Fungi described in 2015